Jan Jaskólski (28 October 1939 – 22 June 2013) was a Polish athlete. He competed in the men's triple jump at the 1960, 1964 and the 1968 Summer Olympics.

References

1939 births
2013 deaths
Athletes (track and field) at the 1960 Summer Olympics
Athletes (track and field) at the 1964 Summer Olympics
Athletes (track and field) at the 1968 Summer Olympics
Polish male triple jumpers
Olympic athletes of Poland
People from Inowrocław
Zawisza Bydgoszcz athletes